Single Life is a 1921 British silent drama film directed by Edwin J. Collins and starring Campbell Gullan, Kathleen Vaughan, and Sidney Paxton.

Cast
 Campbell Gullan - Gerald Hunter 
 Kathleen Vaughan - Hester 
 Sidney Paxton - John Pierce
 Evelyn Hope (actress) - Madame Roland 
 Cyril Raymond - John Henty

References

External links
 

1921 films
British drama films
British silent feature films
Films directed by Edwin J. Collins
1921 drama films
Ideal Film Company films
British black-and-white films
1920s English-language films
1920s British films
Silent drama films